This is a list of members of the 10th  Legislative Assembly of Queensland from 1888 to 1893, as elected at the 1888 colonial election held between 28 April 1888 and 26 May 1888 (due to problems of distance and communications, it was not possible to hold the elections on a single day).

The election was a decisive defeat for Samuel Griffith's Liberals, with Thomas McIlwraith's Conservatives becoming ascendant. During the term, a number of Liberals and Independents joined the Ministry, and by the end of the term, the terms "Ministerial" and "Opposition" were being used to describe members.

See also
Premier:
 Thomas McIlwraith (Conservative) (1888)
 Boyd Dunlop Morehead (Conservative) (1888–1890)
 Samuel Griffith (Ministerial) (1890–1893)
 Thomas McIlwraith (Ministerial) (1893)

Notes

 On 17 July 1889, Robert Lyons, the member for Fitzroy, resigned. Albert Callan won the resulting by-election on 3 August 1889.
 On 24 June 1890, Ernest Hunter, the member for Burke, resigned following his being adjudicated as insolvent. Labour candidate John Hoolan won the resulting by-election on 9 August 1890.
 On 30 June 1890, Henry Jordan, one of the two members for South Brisbane, died. Arthur Morry won the resulting by-election on 17 July 1890.
 On 30 March 1891, John Murtagh Macrossan, one of the two members for Townsville, died. William Villiers Brown won the resulting by-election on 2 May 1891.
 On 12 June 1891, George Hall Jones, the member for Burnett, resigned. James Cadell won the resulting by-election on 11 July 1891.
 On 24 January 1892, Frank Reid Murphy, the member for Barcoo, died. Labour candidate Tommy Ryan won the resulting by-election on 5 March 1892.
 On 29 March 1892, John Buckland, the member for Bulimba, resigned following his being adjudicated as insolvent. James Dickson won the resulting by-election on 16 April 1892.
 On 15 May 1892, Walter Adams, the member for Bundaberg, died. Labour candidate George Hall won the resulting by-election on 16 June 1892.
 On 15 October 1892, Jean-Baptiste Isambert, the member for Rosewood, resigned following his being adjudicated as insolvent. James Foote won the resulting by-election on 15 November 1892.

References

 Waterson, Duncan Bruce: Biographical Register of the Queensland Parliament 1860-1929 (second edition), Sydney 2001.
 
 The General Election. List of Candidates Brisbane Courier, 26 April 1888, p. 6.

Members of Queensland parliaments by term
19th-century Australian politicians